Witchazel is an album by English actor, comedian and musician Matt Berry.

Witchazel is Berry's third album and was originally released as a free download from his website on 11 March 2009. It was commercially released through Acid Jazz Records on 7 March 2011.

Most instruments are played by Berry with Peter Serafinowicz as "Paul McCartney" providing backing vocals on "Rain Came Down".  According to Berry the album is about "the terrors of the countryside".

"Take My Hand" is used as the opening theme for the comedy series Toast of London, and an instrumental version is a recurring motif in the dark comedy series Snuff Box.

Track listing

External links
Official Acid Jazz page

References

2009 albums
Matt Berry albums